Carl Kenneth Aikens Jr. (born June 5, 1962) is a former American football wide receiver/defensive back in the Arena Football League (AFL). He played college football at Northern Illinois University.

Aikens played in the National Football League for the Los Angeles Raiders in 1987 before playing 7 seasons in the AFL for the Chicago Bruisers, Dallas Texans, Orlando Predators & the Milwaukee Mustangs.

In 2000, Aikens was inducted into the Arena Football Hall of Fame.

College career
Aikens played collegiately at Northern Illinois University, where he was a 3-year letter writer for the Huskies football team. (1981, 1983–84). As a senior in 1984, Aikens was named an All-Mid-American Conference Honorable Mention at Split End.

Professional career

Orlando Predators
In 1992, Aikens joined the Orlando Predators. Aikens was a productive member of the Predators on both offense and defense, helping them reach ArenaBowl VI.

Milwaukee Mustangs
In 1994, the Predators traded Aikens to the expansion Milwaukee Mustangs for future considerations.

References

1962 births
Living people
American football wide receivers
American football defensive backs
Northern Illinois Huskies football players
Los Angeles Raiders players
Chicago Bruisers players
Dallas Texans (Arena) players
Orlando Predators players
Milwaukee Mustangs (1994–2001) players
People from Great Lakes, Illinois
National Football League replacement players